The 33rd AVN Awards ceremony, presented by Adult Video News (AVN), honored the best pornographic movies and adult entertainment products of 2015 and took place on January 23, 2016, at The Joint in Hard Rock Hotel and Casino, Paradise, Nevada. During the ceremony, Adult Video News will present AVN Awards (often referred to as the Oscars of porn ) in 115 categories released from October 1, 2014, to September 30, 2015. The ceremony, taped to be televised in the United States by Showtime, was produced by Gary Miller. Comedian and actress Kate Quigley co-hosted the show for the first time, joined by adult movie actresses Joanna Angel and Anikka Albrite.

Winners and nominees 

The nominees for the 33rd AVN Awards were announced on November 19, 2015, at the annual AVN Awards Nominations Party at Avalon nightclub in Hollywood.

Peter Pan XXX: An Axel Braun Parody received the most nominations with 21 total, with Batman v Superman XXX: An Axel Braun Parody came in second with 18. BLACKED.com received 15 nominations, and TUSHY.com was given 12.

The winners were announced during the awards ceremony on January 23, 2016. Despite their lower number of nominations, TUSHY.com were the big winners with Being Riley. Batman v Superman XXX: An Axel Braun Parody also shared  the honors winning five trophies as well. Marriage 2.0, Peter Pan XXX: An Axel Braun Parody and The Submission of Emma Marx: Boundaries each won four awards and European production The Doctor took three.

Major awards

Winners of categories announced during the awards ceremony January 23, 2016, are highlighted in boldface.

Additional award winners
The following is the list of remaining award categories, which were presented apart from the actual awards ceremony.

CONTENT CATEGORIES
 BBW Performer of the Year: Karla Lane
 Best All-Girl Group Sex Scene: Angela White, Alexis Texas, Anikka Albrite, Angela 2
 Best All-Girl Movie: Angela Loves Women
 Best All-Girl Series: Women Seeking Women
 Best Amateur/Pro-Am Movie: It's My First Time 2
 Best Amateur/Pro-Am Series: Bang Bus
 Best Anal Movie: Anal Beauty
 Best Anal Series: DP Me
 Best Anthology Movie: Oil Overload 12
 Best Art Direction: Batman v Superman XXX: An Axel Braun Parody
 Best BDSM Movie: The Submission of Emma Marx: Boundaries
 Best Cinematography: Greg Lansky, Being Riley
 Best Comedy: Love, Sex & TV News
 Best Continuing Series: Dirty Rotten Mother Fuckers
 Best Director - Feature: Paul Deeb, Marriage 2.0
 Best Director – Foreign Feature: Dick Bush, The Doctor
 Best Director – Foreign Non-Feature: Alis Locanta, Waltz With Me
 Best Director – Non-Feature: Jules Jordan, Jesse: Alpha Female
 Best Director – Parody: Axel Braun, Peter Pan XXX: An Axel Braun Parody
 Best Double Penetration Sex Scene: Riley Reid, James Deen, Erik Everhard, Being Riley
 Best Editing: Eddie Powell, Gabrielle Anex, The Submission of Emma Marx: Boundaries
 Best Ethnic Movie: Latin Asses
 Best Ethnic/Interracial Series: My First Interracial
 Best Foreign Feature: The Doctor
 Best Foreign Non-Feature: Waltz With Me
 Best Gonzo Movie: Eye Contact
 Best Group Sex Scene: Keisha Grey, Mick Blue, James Deen, Jon Jon, John Strong, Erik Everhard, Gangbang Me 2
 Best Ingénue Movie: Best New Starlets 2015
 Best Interracial Movie: Black & White 3
 Best Makeup: Cammy Ellis, May Kup, Batman v Superman XXX: An Axel Braun Parody
 Best Male Newcomer: Brad Knight
 Best Marketing Campaign – Individual Project: Marriage 2.0, LionReach/Adam & Eve
 Best Marketing Campaign – Company Image: Blacked/Tushy
 Best MILF Movie: MILF Performers of the Year 2015
 Best New Imprint: Tushy
 Best New Series: All Access
 Best Non-Sex Performance: Christopher Ryan, PhD, Marriage 2.0
 Best Older Woman/Younger Girl Movie:: Lesbian Adventures: Older Women, Younger Girls 6
 Best Oral Movie: Facialized 2
 Best Orgy/Gangbang Movie: Gangbang Me 2
 Best Polyamory Movie: Marriage 2.0
 Best POV Sex Scene: Jillian Janson, Aidra Fox, Jules Jordan, Eye Contact
 Best Screenplay: Jacky St. James, The Submission of Emma Marx: Boundaries
 Best Screenplay – Parody: Axel Braun, Mark Logan, Batman v Superman XXX: An Axel Braun Parody
 Best Sex Scene in a Foreign-Shot Production: Victoria Summers, Danny D., The Doctor
 Best Solo Movie: Glamour Solos 4
 Best Solo/Tease Performance: Abigail Mac, Black & White 4
 Best Soundtrack: Wanted

Content (ctd.)

 Best Special Effects: Batman v Superman XXX: An Axel Braun Parody
 Best Specialty Movie – Other Genre: Cum Inside Me
 Best Specialty Series – Other Genre: Big Tit Cream Pie
 Best Supporting Actor: Steven St. Croix, Peter Pan XXX: An Axel Braun Parody
 Best Taboo Relations Movie: The Father Figure
 Best T/A Movie: Bra Busters 6
 Best Three-Way Sex Scene – Boy/Boy/Girl: Carter Cruise, Flash Brown, Jason Brown, Carter Cruise Obsession
 Best Three-Way Sex Scene – Girl/Girl/Boy: Anikka Albrite, Valentina Nappi, Mick Blue, Anikka's Anal Sluts
 Best Transsexual Movie: The Tranny Bunch
 Best Transsexual Series: The Trans X-Perience
 Best Transsexual Sex Scene: Vixxen Goddess, Adriana Chechik, TS Playground 21
 Clever Title of the Year: That Rapper Destroyed My Crapper
 Female Foreign Performer of the Year: Misha Cross
 Mainstream Star of the Year: Jessica Drake
 Male Foreign Performer of the Year: Rocco Siffredi
 MILF Performer of the Year: Kendra Lust
 Most Outrageous Sex Scene: Lea Lexis, Tommy Pistol in “Nightmare for the Dairy Council,” Analmals

FAN AWARDS
 Favorite Cam Girl: AngelNDemon4u or Devious Angel (There is a discrepancy between what was announced on the AVN Awards' official Twitter feed and the winners' list press release.)
 Favorite Cam Guy: Adam Sinner
 Favorite Camming Couple: Nicolah and Steven Bond
 Favorite Female Performer: Riley Reid
 Favorite Male Performer: Keiran Lee
 Favorite Trans Cam Performer: Kylie Maria
 Favorite Trans Performer: Bailey Jay
 Hottest Newcomer: Abella Danger
 Hottest MILF: Kendra Lust
 Most Amazing Sex Toy: Dani Daniels
 Most Spectacular Boobs: Hitomi Tanaka
 Social Media Star: Riley Reid

WEB & TECHNOLOGY
 Best Affiliate Program: Famedollars (Gamma Entertainment)
 Best Alternative Website: Kink.com
 Best Dating Website: AdultFriendFinder.com
 Best Membership Website: Blacked.com
 Best Porn Star Website: JoannaAngel.com
 Best Solo Girl Website: Vicky Vette, VickyAtHome.com
 Best Web Director: Ivan

PLEASURE PRODUCTS
 Best Condom Manufacturer: Kimono
 Best Enhancement Manufacturer: Classic Erotica
 Best Fetish Manufacturer: Spartacus Leathers
 Best Lingerie or Apparel Manufacturer: Syren Latex
 Best Lubricant Manufacturer: Wet International
 Best Pleasure Product Manufacturer – Large: Doc Johnson
 Best Pleasure Product Manufacturer – Medium: LELO
 Best Pleasure Product Manufacturer – Small: Advanced Response

RETAIL & DISTRIBUTION

 Best Boutique: Early to Bed (Chicago)
 Best Retail Chain – Small: Good Vibrations
 Best Retail Chain – Large: Romantix
 Best Web Retail Store: AdultEmpire.com

Multiple nominations and awards 

 The following 12 releases received multiple awards:

Honorary AVN awards

Visionary Award
The Visionary Award went to AVN founder Paul Fishbein.

Hall of Fame
AVN on December 18, 2015, announced the 2016 inductees into its hall of fame:

 Founders Branch: Fred Hirsch, Rudy Sutton, Eddie Wedelstedt
 Video Branch: Joanna Angel, Nikki Benz, DCypher, Jonni Darkko, Dana DeArmond, Nikita Denise, Tommy Gunn, Kimberly Kane, Sascha Koch, Alex Ladd, Teagan Presley, John Strong, Shyla Stylez, Dana Vespoli, Vicky Vette
 Executive Branch: Jon Blitt, Bob Christian, Scott David, Eric Gutterman, Steve Volponi, Nelson X
 Pleasure Products Branch: Ralph Caplan, Rina Valan, Steve Shubin
 Internet Founders Branch: Charles Berrebbi and John Albright, Ilan Bunimovitz

Presenters and performers
The following individuals presented awards or performed musical numbers or comedy sketches.

Presenters

Performers

Ceremony information 
For the first time, content released solely on video-on-demand is eligible for AVN Awards consideration. AVN announced VOD content would be eligible in the Best Boy/Girl Sex Scene, Best Girl/Girl Sex Scene, Best Oral Sex Scene and Best Anal Sex Scene categories. As usual, several of the categories were renamed and redefined and a new niche category was added, Best Polyamory Movie.

AVN has also stated that porn star James Deen, who has been the subject of publicized assault allegations, will continue to be eligible for awards in categories he or his production company has been nominated for, since the awards "do not reflect an official position on any other matter involving James Deen."

See also

 AVN Award
 AVN Award for Male Foreign Performer of the Year
 AVN Female Performer of the Year Award
 List of members of the AVN Hall of Fame

References

External links 

  and List of nominees
 Adult Video News

AVN Awards
2015 film awards
AVN Awards 33